Scott Swanson, pen name J.T. Patten, is an American military writer, novelist, and former intelligence advisor. He is notable for his work in military Special Warfare intelligence, and is featured in Montgomery McFate's book Military Anthropology: Soldiers, Scholars and Subjects at the Margins of Empire and Steve Coll's book, Directorate S: The C.I.A. and America’s Secret Wars in Afghanistan and Pakistan.

Professionally, Scott is Aon (company)'s Cyber Security Advisory Practice Leader.Prior, he worked as a financial crimes investigator for PwC's Financial Crimes Unit. Formerly, he has worked as a government intelligence operative. He specializes in socio-cultural intelligence and Irregular warfare and which covers operational considerations, focusing on Africa, the Middle East, and Southeast Asia regions.

Biography 
Scott grew up in Chicago and graduated with a degree in foreign languages from the Illinois State University. Later, he received a master’s degree from the American Military University.

Bibliography

U.S. Army Publications
 Swanson, Scott; Lieutenant General Boykin, William. Operationalizing Intelligence Special Warfare Bulletin, U.S. Army John F. Kennedy Special Warfare Center and School (SWCS).

Novels 
 Patten, J.T. (2013). Safe Havens: Shadow Masters
 Patten, J.T. (2016). Safe Havens: Primed Charge
 Patten, J.T. (2018). Buried in Black
 Patten, J.T. (2019). The Presence of Evil
 Patten, J.T. (2020). Presidential Retreat: A Sean Havens Black Ops
 Patten, J.T. (2021). Shadow Masters Reloaded: A Sean Havens Black Ops Thriller
 Patten, J.T. (2022). Whispers of a Gypsy

Publications 
 Grange, David; as "Patten, J.T." Assessing and Targeting Illicit Funding in Conflict Ecosystems
 Swanson, Scott. Asymmetrical Factors in Culture for SOF Conflicts: Gaining Understanding and Insights
 Swanson, Scott. Cyber Threat Indications & Warning: Predict, Identify and Counter
 Swanson, Scott. Know Your Enemy: Human Intelligence Key to SOF Missions
 Swanson, Scott. Improving Asymmetrical Insights with Cultural Understanding
 Swanson, Scott. Indications and Warning Post 9/11: Analyzing Enemy Intent
 Swanson, Scott, Red Team Improvements
 Swanson, Scott. Terrorism and Third Party Combatants: Iran, Venezuela and Hezbollah
 Swanson, Scott. Viral Targeting of the IED Social Network System

Interviews 
 Patten, J.T. (2021) J.T. Patten - Shadow Masters (Reloaded), House of Mystery Radio on NBC
 Patten, J.T. (2022) Intel Contractor Pens Story on America's Most Secretive Unit, Connecting Vets
 Patten, J.T. (2022) J.T. Patten - Whispers of a Gypsy, House of Mystery Radio on NBC

References 

American military writers
Illinois State University alumni
Year of birth missing (living people)
Living people